Adrian Moore is an electroacoustic music composer born January 1969 in Nottingham, UK, and currently living in Sheffield, UK. He is director of the University of Sheffield Sound Studios.

Biography
Moore studied at the City University, London and the University of Birmingham  with Jonty Harrison. His works are available from Empreintes DIGITALes

Recordings
 Rêve de l'aube (empreintes DIGITALes, IMED 0684, 2006)
 Traces (empreintes DIGITALes, IMED 0053, 2000)

List of works
 (1/V)T (1996)
 3Pieces: Horn (2007)
 3Pieces: Piano (2007)
 3Pieces: Violin (2007)
 And By His Suggestion (1993)
 Becalmed 1 (2001)
 Dreamarena (1996)
 Dreaming of the Dawn (2004)
 Ethereality (2000)
 Fleeting Images
 Foil-Counterfoil (1997)
 Junky (1996)
 Mutiny On The Bounty (2001)
 Out There and Beyond (1999)
 Piano Piece (for Peter) (2004), piano, and tape
 Power Tools (2004)
 Requiem (1996)
 Resonant Image (2003), Surround sound, and video
 Rococo Variations (2005–06)
 Sea of Singularity (2001–03)
 Sieve (1994–95)
 Soundbodies: Bodypart (1998)
 Study in Ink (1997)
 Superstrings (1998–99)
 Third Mint Sauce or Sheep Appoggiatura (2001)

References

External links

 His personal site

Living people
Electroacoustic music composers
English composers
1969 births
People from Nottingham
Academics of the University of Sheffield
Alumni of City, University of London
Alumni of the University of Birmingham